The 1920 United States presidential election in Florida, was held on November 2, 1920. Voters chose six representatives, or electors to the Electoral College, who voted for President and Vice-President.

Background
Ever since the disfranchisement of blacks at the beginning of the 1890s, Florida had been a one-party state ruled by the Democratic Party. The disfranchisement of blacks and poor whites by poll taxes in 1889 had left the Republican Party – between 1872 and 1888 dependent upon black votes – virtually extinct.

With the single exception of William Howard Taft's win in Calhoun County in 1908 the Democratic Party won every county in Florida in every Presidential election from 1892 until 1916. Only twice – and never for more than one term – did any Republican serve in either house of the state legislature between 1896 and 1928.

Despite this Democratic dominance and the restrictions on the franchise of the poorer classes due to the poll tax, significant socialist movements were to develop and persist in Tampa and to a lesser extent over other parts of the state, especially against the powerful Ku Klux Klan. In 1919, 4,800 miners led by the Mineral Workers Union would go on strike for 7 1/2 months in Polk County. The reason for the strike were that they wanted an 8 hour work day and a minimum wage of 37 cents. Governor Sidney J. Catts called on the Florida National Guard and the Polk County Home Guard to end the strike. At the end of the strike, 5 strikers would die.

There was also a powerful Prohibitionist movements in older North Florida, which saw the Prohibition Party even win the governorship for one term under the notorious anti-Catholic minister Sidney J. Catts.

The 1920 election saw Harding make mild inroads into the absolute Democratic dominance of the state's politics, largely owing to considerable isolationist sentiment, and major economic concerns following the decline of industries related to World War I. He carried three counties in the south of the state, being only the second Republican to carry a Florida county since black disfranchisement, and begun tentative steps towards establishing a white GOP base in what was to become the "Sun Belt" after the development of air conditioning decades later. Eugene Debs, who had taken advantage of substantial radicalism in parts of South Florida to run second to Woodrow Wilson in the state in 1912, did not do nearly so well and was only marginally ahead of Prohibition candidate Watkins.

Results

Results by county

Notes

References 

Florida
1920
1920 Florida elections